In the 2018–19 rugby union season, the  participated in the 2018–19 Pro14 competition, their second appearance since joining the competition in 2017–18.

Personnel

Coaches and management

The Cheetahs coaching and management staff for the 2018–19 Pro14 season are:

Squad

The Cheetahs squad for the 2018–19 Pro14 is:

Player movements

Player movements between the 2017–18 Pro14 season and the end 2018–19 Pro14 season are as follows:

Standings

The final Conference A log standings were:

Round-by-round

The table below shows the Cheetahs' progression throughout the season. For each round, their cumulative points total is shown with the conference position:

Matches

The Cheetahs' matches in the 2018–19 Pro14 were:

Player statistics

The Pro14 appearance record for players that represented the Cheetahs in 2018–19 is as follows:

See also

 Cheetahs
 Pro14

References

Cheetahs (rugby union)
Cheetahs
Cheetahs
Cheetahs